William Steffens (5 November 1880 – 1964) was a Norwegian military officer, born in Christiania. He was Major General and commander of the Norwegian 4th Division from 1935. During the Norwegian Campaign in 1940 he was Head of the Armed Forces in Western Norway. He was a delegate in Canada for the Norwegian government-in-exile in London from 1940 to 1941, and was military attaché in the Soviet Union from 1941 to 1945.

References

1880 births
1964 deaths
Military personnel from Oslo
Norwegian Army World War II generals
Norwegian expatriates in Canada
Norwegian expatriates in the Soviet Union
Norwegian military attachés